Veis is a surname. Notable people with the surname include:

Andrei Veis (born 1990), Estonian footballer
Greg Veis, American magazine editor
Jaroslav Veis (born 1946), Czech journalist and writer

See also
Voz Veis, Venezuelan musical group